An intake ramp is a rectangular, plate-like device within the air intake of a jet engine, designed to generate a number of shock waves to aid the inlet compression process at supersonic speeds. The ramp sits at an acute angle to deflect the intake air from the longitudinal direction. At supersonic flight speeds, the deflection of the air stream creates a number of oblique shock waves at each change of gradient along at the ramp. Air crossing each shock wave suddenly slows to a lower Mach number, thus increasing pressure.

Ideally, the first oblique shock wave should intercept the air intake lip, thus avoiding air spillage and pre-entry drag on the outer boundary of the deflected streamtube. For a fixed geometry intake at zero incidence, this condition can only be achieved at one particular flight Mach number, because the angle of the shock wave (to the longitudinal direction) becomes more acute with increasing aircraft speed.

More advanced supersonic intakes feature a ramp with a number of discrete changes of gradient in order to generate multiple oblique shock waves. In the case of Concorde, the first (converging) intake ramp is followed by a diverging ramp. After the air passes the end of the first ramp it has become subsonic such that the diverging ramp further contributes towards the reduction in airstream velocity and consequently its increase in pressure. This intake design thus ensures excellent pressure recovery and contributes to Concorde's improved fuel efficiency whilst cruising supersonically at up to Mach 2.2 (beyond which airframe heating effects limit any further increase in speed).

Variable geometry intakes, such as those on Concorde, vary the ramp angle to focus the series of oblique shock waves onto the intake lip, control of which is accomplished by complex non-linear control laws using the ramp void pressure (the pressure of the air in the gap between the two ramps) as a control input.

The intake ramp for rectangular intakes has its equivalent in the inlet cone for circular intakes. Much lighter fixed-geometry alternatives are used on modern aircraft which are designed with greater emphasis on durability and survivability (stealth). These inlets preserve the performance of variable intake ramps by controlling shock position using the downstream pressure. They include the caret compression surface, used in the Boeing F/A-18E/F Super Hornet and Lockheed Martin F-22 Raptor inlets, and the diverterless supersonic inlet used on the Lockheed Martin F-35 Lightning II and Chengdu J-20.

Intake gallery

References

See also
Inlet cone
Splitter plate

Aircraft propulsion components